Jerry Hubbard may refer to:

Jerry Reed (1937–2008), or Jerry Reed Hubbard, American country music singer
Jerry Hubbard, bassist in The Time
Jerry Hubbard, character on American TV series Fernwood 2 Night